Lenka Juríková (born 11 August 1990) is a Slovak tennis player.

Juríková has won eleven singles titles and five doubles titles on the ITF Women's Circuit. On 2 May 2011, she reached her career-high singles ranking of world No. 196. On 21 March 2011, she peaked at No. 326 in the doubles rankings.

ITF finals

Singles (11–8)

Doubles (5–9)

External links
 
 

1990 births
Living people
Tennis players from Bratislava
Slovak female tennis players
21st-century Slovak women